Dwaine Wilson (June 11, 1960 – April 12, 2008) was an American player of gridiron football, an award-winning running back during a brief Canadian Football League (CFL) career.

A graduate of Idaho State University in Pocatello, Idaho, he played two seasons for the Montreal Concordes (part of the Montreal Alouettes franchise history). In 1984, he played 16 games and in 1985 he played 13 games.

In 1984, he rushed 226 times for 1083 yards, which won him all-star accolades and CFL's Most Outstanding Rookie Award. In 1985, his production fell off to 435 yards rushing in his second and final CFL season.

Wilson drowned on April 12, 2008, while boating with friends at Lake Elsinore, California.

References 

1960 births
2008 deaths
Montreal Concordes players
Idaho State Bengals football players
Canadian football running backs
Accidental deaths in California
Deaths by drowning in California
Canadian Football League Rookie of the Year Award winners
People from Carson, California
Players of American football from California
Sportspeople from Los Angeles County, California
National Football League replacement players